Kenuichio Harada, also known as the original Silver Samurai, is a fictional character appearing in American comic books published by Marvel Comics. A mutant with the power to charge his own katana, the character first appeared in Daredevil #111 (July 1974), and was created by writer Steve Gerber and artist Bob Brown. The character is depicted usually as a recurring nemesis of Wolverine.

The character has appeared in several X-Men-related animated series and video games. Kenuichio Harada made its live-action debut in the 2013 film The Wolverine, played by Will Yun Lee.

In 1978, the Silver Samurai was the villain in one of the oddest team-ups in Marvel Comics history: Marvel Team-Up #74 (Oct), featuring Spider-Man and the cast of Saturday Night Live. The character faced off against comedian John Belushi in his samurai character.

Fictional character biography
Kenuichio Harada is the illegitimate son of Shingen Yashida. A Japanese mutant who uses his powers to charge his katana, his samurai-style armor made of a silvery metal led to the Silver Samurai moniker.

He became a professional criminal and appeared to clash with Daredevil when he was hired by Mandrill and Black Spectre.

Harada was the bodyguard for the international terrorist Viper, and was an occasional mercenary. While working for Viper, he fought Spider-Man and Black Widow. After recovering Viper's teleportation ring, he fought Spider-Man again on the set of Saturday Night Live when Stan Lee appeared as a host and encountered the original (2nd season) Not-Ready-For-Prime-Time-Players. He joined Viper and Boomerang in fighting Spider-Man, Nick Fury, Shang-Chi, and Black Widow on the original S.H.I.E.L.D. helicarrier. Harada and Viper attempted to kidnap Michael Kramer and fought the original Spider-Woman.

At some point during Hydra's attack on Japan, he killed police officer Kioshi Keishicho which led to Amatsu-Mikaboshi giving Koishi a deal that involved him turning Kioshi into the Ebon Samurai.

Harada and Viper attempted a theft of cavourite crystal and battled the New Mutants. They battled the X-Men and Yukio. He attempted to possess the Black Blade and battled Wolverine, Lindsay McCabe and O'Donnell. He rescued Wolverine and Jessica Drew from cultists.

He became the Oyabun (leader) of Clan Yashida after his half-sister Mariko Yashida died. He attempted to pay off his clan's debts to the Yakuza and restore its honor. Though once one of Wolverine's greatest enemies, Wolverine entrusted him with the care of Amiko Kobayashi.

The Silver Samurai once helped Wolverine destroy "Doombringer", and later helped Logan rescue Amiko and Yukio from their kidnappers. During his time as a hero, the Silver Samurai became the leader of the first Japanese superhero team Big Hero 6.

The Silver Samurai was brainwashed by Blindspot into forgetting his time as a hero, believing his redemption was just a result of Professor X's brainwashing. As a result, he returned to his previous criminal activities. Harada was operating as the chief security officer for the Prime Minister of Japan.

The Silver Samurai was abducted, incarcerated in the Raft prison in America without trial, and official records stated he was dead. He was freed by Madame Hydra and the Hand who transported him back to Japan. They wanted him to lead the Hand and unite the Japanese criminal underworld, hoping he could take on shadowy figures controlling both HYDRA and S.H.I.E.L.D. that Madame Hydra was reluctant to name. Harada wasn't interested in a war and helped the Avengers defeat them. Afterward, he decided to try to earn his good name back by serving the people of Japan once again.

Silver Samurai is one of the few mutants that retained their superhuman powers after M-Day. Wolverine made way to Japan in search of Harada and engaged him in battle. Wolverine's memories were recovered due to the events of House of M and asked Silver Samurai questions about the past during the course of their fight. Silver Samurai was able to run Wolverine through with one of his swords. Immediately afterward, Wolverine's claws severed Harada's hand at the wrist. When last seen, Silver Samurai was kneeling on the floor cradling the bloody stump where his hand once was.

After the Skrull invasion, Viper left the Silver Samurai to rejoin Hydra. Viper later came with a new version of Madame Hydra to negotiate support to be given to Typhon (Hydra's production front) from the Yashidas. They took a mysterious box; the Yashidas claimed that those who opened the box never lived to see another day. Some time later, warriors of Leviathan attacked the Silver Samurai to make him divulge the box's location.

While defending his home from the Red Right Hand, the Silver Samurai was mortally wounded. With his last bit of power, he made his way to his half-sister's grave. He later appeared in Hell blaming Wolverine for the recent deaths of people and was beheaded by Marduk Kurios's Soulcutter after speaking.

The original Silver Samurai was revealed to be the father of Shingen "Shin" Harada.

Silver Samurai was resurrected in Krakoa by the Five and became responsible for officiating combat at the Arena in the Quarry.

Powers and abilities
Kenuichio Harada is a mutant with the ability to generate a tachyon field, with which he can surround anything. He commonly uses his power on his sword, enabling it to cut through nearly anything, except substances as hard as adamantium. When working with the Viper, Kenuichio possessed a teleportation ring, which allowed him to teleport from one location to another, granting him great mobility and stealth. As a self-styled samurai, he is a master of kenjutsu and other martial arts. Kenuichio specialized in edged weapons, hand-to-hand combat, and military tactics. He usually wears a suit of lightweight steel alloy body armor, modeled after traditional samurai armor, but made of modern protective materials. He carries a katana (long sword), shuriken (throwing stars), and other weaponry. Keniuchio has extensive knowledge of the operations of criminal organizations due to his shady past, which he used in the service of his government to combat such organizations. He is an expert in the history and customs of the samurai class (Bushido).

Other versions

Age of Apocalypse
In the "Age of Apocalypse" story, published in 2005 to celebrate the 10th anniversary of the Age of Apocalypse storyline, the Silver Samurai was a key member of the X-Men. He wore no helmet and had a red upside down Omega symbol tattooed on his forehead. He was one of the team's more visible members, rash yet strong. It was revealed that the Silver Samurai and Wolverine met each other in Japan, some time before Logan rescued Mariko from thugs. He was aware of the existence of Psylocke, a rare telepath, but how the Silver Samurai was convinced to join Magneto's X-Men in the first place was not explained. He was much later reported by the Age of Apocalypse version of William Stryker to have been killed in action while defending the last human stronghold from the forces of the now crazed Age of Apocalypse version of Wolverine.

Marvel Noir
In the Marvel Noir universe, Lieutenant Kenuichio Harada appeared as a Japanese policeman in the "X-Men Noir" sequel titled "Mark of Cain".

Exiles
In Exiles #83 (August 2006), another alternate version of the Silver Samurai was revealed. Originating from Earth-172, the Silver Samurai appeared to have a nice relationship between Mariko Yashida and that Earth's Wolverine who was a briefly seen member of the reality-hopping counterpart team of the Exiles called Weapon X. Wolverine had vanished out of their sight for months to join the said team, and was later killed in action and returned by the Exiles to his home world. The Silver Samurai and Mariko of that alternate world still don't fully know what happened to their version of Wolverine, but honored the man's death with a proper funeral by burning Logan's ashes via cremation.

House of M
In the House of M, Kenuicho Harada was a powerful businessman and secretly the head of Clan Yashida, a powerful crime family. His daughter Mariko Harada was kidnapped by Madame Hydra who wanted to blackmail Harada into revealing his illegal businesses.

Marvel Zombies
In Marvel Zombies vs. The Army of Darkness #4, the Silver Samurai and Sunfire are bitten and infected by Quicksilver. During the Silver Surfer's globe-spanning travels, they are seen attacking innocent civilians.

What If?
In the What If story "What If Wolverine Had Married Mariko", Kenuichio Harada united with Mariko and Wolverine in their struggle against the Kingpin who had taken control of the Yakuza and engaged in a turf war with the Shingen clan for control. At that time, the Silver Samurai was secretly working for the Kingpin, and upon their final encounter, he assassinated Mariko, whereupon he was killed by Wolverine in retaliation.

In other media

Television
 The Silver Samurai appears in the X-Men episode "The Lotus and the Steel", voiced by Denis Akiyama. This version was a gang leader whose thugs terrorized villages for tributes to him every year. Wolverine encounters him while gathering timber and is warned not to interfere. However, Jubilee helps the villagers stand their ground while Wolverine defeats Silver Samurai in single combat.
 The Silver Samurai appears in the Wolverine and the X-Men episode "Code of Conduct", voiced by Keone Young. This version is Mariko Yashida's power-hungry husband and a member of the Yakuza who previously fought Wolverine over Mariko and was defeated by him. In the present, Harada seeks a rematch with Wolverine to redeem himself of the defeat and become the Yakuza's head. Following an unsanctioned attack on Wolverine and the X-Men however, Harada's leader calls for a duel between Wolverine and Harada without their Mutant abilities per samurai code. The following night, the duel takes place, with Harada taunting Wolverine with the claim that the former only married Mariko to keep her away from him. Despite this, Wolverine defeats Harada once more. Angered, Harada attempts to cheat by using his powers, but is knocked out by the Yakuza, who forfeits the duel on his behalf and take him away. Mariko later tells Wolverine that Harada will be driven out from the Yakuza in shame and that he will never be admitted again.
 The Silver Samurai appears in Marvel Disk Wars: The Avengers, voiced by Takanori Nishikawa.
 The Silver Samurai appears in Marvel's Hit-Monkey, voiced by Noshir Dalal. This version is conceited and known as Japan's biggest hero.

Film 
Kenuichio Harada appears in The Wolverine, portrayed by Will Yun Lee. This version is a human archer, the leader of the Black Ninja Clan, which is sworn to protect the Yashida Clan, a former lover of Mariko Yashida's, and is not stated to be connected to Shingen Yashida. When the Yakuza attack Ichiro Yashida's apparent funeral to kidnap Mariko, Harada protects her, though he later leads the Black Ninja Clan in kidnapping Mariko for the mutant Viper and Ichiro. While fighting Logan, Harada realizes the error of his ways and attempts to stop Ichiro, only to be killed by him.

Video games
 The Silver Samurai appears as a playable character in X-Men: Children of the Atom, voiced by Yasushi Ikeda. This version wields giant shurikens and possesses the ability to empower his katana with lightning, fire, and ice-based properties instead of his comics' abilities.
 The Silver Samurai appears as a playable character in Marvel vs. Capcom 2: New Age of Heroes, voiced again by Yasushi Ikeda. 
 The Silver Samurai appears as a boss in X-Men: The Official Game, voiced again by Keone Young. This version is the head of HYDRA and the mentor of Lady Deathstrike. Additionally, he and HYDRA collaborated with William Stryker on Master Mold and the Sentinels years before Weapon X would do so. Following Stryker's death, HYDRA is sent in to remove all Sentinel equipment and files while Jason Stryker activates Master Mold. Wolverine infiltrates HYDRA's headquarters and duels Silver Samurai for information on how to stop Master Mold and the Sentinels before eventually emerging victorious.
 The Silver Samurai appears as an unlockable playable character in Lego Marvel Super Heroes, voiced by Andrew Kishino.

References

External links
 
 Silver Samurai of Earth-616 at Marvel Wiki
 Silver Samurai of Earth-295 at Marvel Wiki
 Silver Samurai I at Comic Vine
 UncannyXmen.net Spotlight On Silver Samurai

Villains in animated television series
Big Hero 6 characters
Characters created by Bob Brown
Characters created by Steve Gerber
Comics characters introduced in 1974
Fictional amputees
Fictional businesspeople
Fictional gangsters
Fictional henchmen
Fictional samurai
Fictional swordfighters in comics
Japanese superheroes
Male characters in comics
Marvel Comics characters who can teleport
Marvel Comics martial artists
Marvel Comics mutants
Marvel Comics superheroes
Marvel Comics supervillains
Superhero film characters
Wolverine (comics) characters
X-Men supporting characters